Richard Delabere (c. 1559 – 1636), of Lincoln's Inn, London, was an English politician.

He was a Member (MP) of the Parliament of England for Cricklade in 1586 and for Cardigan Boroughs in 1601.

References

1550s births
1636 deaths
Members of the Parliament of England (pre-1707) for constituencies in Wales
English MPs 1586–1587
English MPs 1601
Members of the Parliament of England (pre-1707) for Cricklade